Bronina  is a village in the administrative district of Gmina Busko-Zdrój, within Busko County, Świętokrzyskie Voivodeship, in south-central Poland.

References

Bronina